Fusus is a genus of small to large sea snails, marine gastropod molluscs in the family Fasciolariidae, the spindle snails and tulip snails.

Fusus as a name for a genus of gastropods has confusingly been used three times. These names are, in whatever taxonomical sense, now invalid. This page is kept for historical reasons.

The name of the genus Fusus Bruguière, 1789 is invalid as it is a junior homonym of Fusus Helbling, 1779. (Placed by the ICZN on the Official Index by Opinion 1765, 1994, Bulletin of Zoological Nomenclature, 51(2): 159). The accepted name is Fusinus Rafinesque, 1815 

The genus Fusus Helbling, 1779, has also been placed on the Official Index by Opinion 1765 (1994, Bulletin of Zoological Nomenclature 51(2): 159-161), i.e. it cannot be used as a valid name. The type species of Fusus Helbling is Murex intertextus Helbling, 1779 (= Fusus intertextus Helbling, 1779), and it belongs in the family Colubrariidae.

Fusus Helbling, 1779 (Mollusca, Gastropoda) has been suppressed, and Fusinus Rafinesque, 1815 and Colubraria Schumacher, 1817 are conserved.  ICZN 1993. Opinion 1765. Bulletin of Zoological Nomenclature, 51(2): 159-161  CZN 1993. Opinion 1765. Bulletin of Zoological Nomenclature, 51(2): 159-161

The genus Fusus Röding, 1798 (type species = Fusus cynara Röding, 1798 = Turbinella angulata (Lightfoot, 1786) ) is a junior homonym of Fusus Helbling, 1779. It has also been placed on the Official Index of the ICZN by Opinion 1765 and is an invalid name.

Species 
The following species with specific epithets of species now placed in Colubrariidae, have been placed arbitrarily in the genus Fusus Helbling, 1779  
 Fusus adjunctus (Iredale, 1929): synonym of Cumia adjuncta (Iredale, 1929)
 Fusus alfredensis (Bartsch, 1915): synonym of Cumia alfredensis (Bartsch, 1915)
 Fusus bednalli (Brazier, 1875): synonym of Cumia bednalli (Brazier, 1875)
 Fusus brazieri (Angas, 1869): synonym of  Cumia brazieri (Angas, 1869)
 Fusus lucasi Bozzetti, 2007: synonym of Cumia lucasi (Bozzetti, 2007)
 Fusus mestayerae Iredale, 1915: synonym of Cumia mestayerae (Iredale, 1915)
 Fusus schoutanicus (May, 1910): synonym of Cumia schoutanica (May, 1910)
 Fusus simonis Bozzetti, 2004: synonym of Cumia simonis (Bozzetti, 2004)

Species within the genus Fusus Bruguière, 1789 include arbitrarily all the species that haven't been designated to Fusus Helbling, 1779:. Most species have been synonymized with a species in Fusinus.

 Fusus aurantius Anton, 1838: nomen dubium
 Fusus blainvillii Mavarigna, 1840: nomen dubium
 Fusus blakensis Hadorn & Roger, 2000: synonym of Fusinus blakensis  Hadorn & Roger, 2000
 Fusus branscombi Clark W., 1849: synonym of Comarmondia gracilis (Montagu, 1803)
 Fusus brevis Brown, 1827: nomen dubium
 Fusus chonoticus Philippi, 1858: nomen dubium
 Fusus clavatus della Chiaje, 1830: nomen dubium
 Fusus colus (Linnaeus, 1758): synonym of Fusinus colus (Linnaeus, 1758)
 Fusus contabulatus Anton, 1838: nomen dubium
 Fusus crassus Pallary, 1901: synonym of Fusinus cretellai Buzzurro & Russo, 2008
 Fusus crebricostatus Lamarck, 1822: nomen dubium
 Fusus cygneus Philippi, 1852: nomen dubium
 Fusus dalli Watson, 1882: synonym of Granulifusus dalli (Watson, 1882)
 Fusus dexter Menke, 1829: nomen dubium
 Fusus doliatus Valenciennes, 1832: nomen dubium
 Fusus dunkeri Jonas, 1846: synonym of Microcolus dunkeri (Jonas, 1846)
 Fusus elegantissimus Bioni Giunti, 1860: nomen dubium
 Fusus filosa (A. Adams & Reeve, 1850): synonym of Polygona filosa
 Fusus follicus Lesson, 1842 :: nomen dubium
 Fusus frondosus Lesson, 1842: nomen dubium
 Fusus fusconodosus G.B. Sowerby II, 1880: nomen dubium
 Fusus gieseckii Anton, 1839: nomen dubium
 Fusus gilvus Philippi, 1849: nomen dubium
 Fusus glacialis Gray, 1839: nomen dubium
 Fusus glomeratus Mörch, 1852: nomen dubium
 Fusus gracilis Koch, 1845: nomen dubium
 Fusus granulosus Anton, 1839: nomen dubium
 Fusus guttatus Busch, 1844: nomen dubium
 Fusus harfordii Stearns, 1871: synonym of Fusinus harfordii (Stearns, 1871)
 Fusus heterostrophus de Gregorio, 1885: nomen dubium
 Fusus imbricatus Lesson, 1842 : synonym of Lataxiena desserti Houart, 1995
 Fusus incertus Smith, 1906: nomen dubium
 Fusus indicus Anton, 1838: synonym of Marmorofusus tuberculatus (Lamarck, 1822)
 Fusus junior Audouin, 1826: nomen dubium
 Fusus juvenis Bivona, 1838: nomen dubium
 Fusus lanceolatus Koch, 1846: nomen dubium
 Fusus lateroides (Monterosato, 1891): synonym of Fusinus rostratus (Olivi, 1792)
 Fusus libratus Watson, 1886: synonym of Granulifusus dalli (Watson, 1882)
 Fusus lineatus Menke, 1829: nomen dubium
 Fusus liratus Philippi, 1887: synonym of Xymenopsis muriciformis  (King & Broderip, 1833)
 Fusus lusitanicus Allen, 1858: nomen dubium
 Fusus luteopictus Dall, 1887: synonym of Fusinus luteopictus
 Fusus maroccensis (Gmelin, 1791): synonym of Fusinus maroccensis (Gmelin, 1791)
 Fusus monachus Anton, 1838: nomen dubium
 Fusus muricinus Anton, 1839: nomen dubium
 Fusus nigrinus Philippi, 1858: nomen dubium
 Fusus niponicus Smith, 1879: synonym of Granulifusus niponicus (E.A. Smith, 1879)
 Fusus niveus Gray, 1838: nomen dubium
 Fusus nobilis Reeve, 1847: synonym of Fusinus nobilis (Reeve, 1847)
 Fusus nodicinctus A. Adams, 1855: synonym of Otopleura nodicincta (A. Adams, 1855)
 Fusus obscurus Philippi, 1844: nomen dubium
 Fusus pazi Crosse, 1859: nomen dubium
 Fusus perminutus (Dall, 1927): synonym of Americominella perminuta
 Fusus philippi Jonas, 1846: nomen dubium
 Fusus pictus (Turton, 1825): nomen dubium
 Fusus pleurotomoides Anton, 1838: nomen dubium
 Fusus plicosus (Menke, 1830): nomen dubium
 Fusus productus Mörch, 1876: nomen dubium
 Fusus prolongata Turton, 1932: nomen dubium
 Fusus punctatus Anton, 1838: nomen dubium
 Fusus pyruloides Lesson, 1842: nomen dubium
 Fusus retroversus Fleming, 1823: synonym of Limacina retroversa (Fleming, 1823)
 Fusus roedingi Anton, 1838: nomen dubium
 Fusus rolani Buzzurro & Ovalis, 2005: synonym of Fusinus rolani Buzzurro & Ovalis, 2005
 Fusus roseus Hombron & Jacquinot, 1848: synonym of Pareuthria powelli Cernohorsky, 1977
 Fusus rubens Lamarck, 1822: nomen dubium
 Fusus rugosus Lamarck, 1816: nomen dubium
 Fusus sinuatus Lesson, 1842: nomen dubium
 Fusus steneus Nardo, 1847: nomen dubium
 Fusus sulcatus Lamarck: synonym of Penion sulcatus (Lamarck, 1816)
 Fusus syracusanus (Linnaeus, 1758): synonym of Fusinus syracusanus (Linnaeus, 1758)
 Fusus thielei Schepman, 1911: synonym of Fusinus thielei (Schepman, 1911)
 Fusus toreuma (Martyn, 1784): synonym of Fusinus colus (Linnaeus, 1758)
 Fusus triskaedekagonus Anton, 1838: nomen dubium
 Fusus tuberculatus Lamarck, 1822: synonym of Fusinus colus (Linnaeus, 1758)
 Fusus varicosus Anton, 1838: nomen dubium
 Fusus ventricosus Lesson, 1842: nomen dubium
 Fusus verrucosus (Gmelin, 1791): synonym of Fusinus verrucosus (Gmelin, 1791)
 Fusus virga Gray, 1839: nomen dubium
 Fusus zebrinus Odhner, 1923: synonym of Fusinus zebrinus (Odhner, 1923)

References

Further reading 
 Dall W. H. (1877). On the Californian Species of Fusus.
 Grabau A. W. (1904). Phylogeny of Fusus and its allies.
 Beu, A G - Marshall, B A - Ponder, Wf (1992), Comments On The Proposed Confirmation Of Unavailability Of The Name Fusus Helbling, 1779 (Mollusca, Gastropoda); Bulletin of Zoological Nomenclature 49 p. 68-70

 
Gastropod genera
Obsolete gastropod taxa